The Administration Building is a building on the Seattle University campus, in the U.S. state of Washington.

History 
The building received a new entryway in 2017.

In 2022, students hosted a sit-in at the building over a policy related to LGBT rights.

References

External links 

 

Buildings and structures in Seattle
Seattle University campus